The 1923 Canton Bulldogs season was their fourth in the league. The team improved on their previous output of 10–0–2, winning eleven games. With the best record in the league, they were crowned the NFL Champions.

Schedule

Standings

References

Canton Bulldogs seasons
Canton Bulldogs
National Football League championship seasons
Canton Bulldogs